Earthfasts is a BBC children's drama series based upon the 1966 book of the same title by William Mayne. It was filmed on location in Richmond and Wensleydale, North Yorkshire, and was aired in 1994.

Plot summary
Schoolboys Keith and David (Chris Downs & Paul Nicholls) hear drumming under the hill on the moor near their homes, and set out to investigate. The hillside unexpectedly opens and Nellie Jack John (Bryan Dick), a drummer boy from the 18th century marches into the 20th. Bewildered and lost in a strange world, he decides to go back home.

David discovers that the candle the drummer boy left behind gives off cold rather than heat and does not burn down. Other strange things are happening – standing stones are moving on the moors, the ground is shaking and all the pigs have disappeared.

Obsessed by the candle, David heads underground and does not return. Keith searches for his friend. There is a strange encounter with ghostly warriors.

References
 BFI Film and TV Database

External links 
 

BBC children's television shows
1990s British children's television series
British children's fantasy television series
English-language television shows
1994 British television series debuts
1994 British television series endings